Beijing Youth Daily or Beijing qingnianbao (Abbreviation: BYD) is the official newspaper of the Beijing Municipal Committee of the Communist Youth League of China (中国共产主义青年团北京市委员会). 

Beijing Youth Daily was launched on 21 March 1949, and is now published by the Beijing Youth Daily Agency (北京青年报社). It is the most widely circulated metropolitan newspaper in Beijing.

Beijing Youth Daily has halted production three times in its history. It has been published since 1981.

It is assigned the Chinese Issue Number CN11-0103.

Publication

The daily typically publishes about 50 broadsheet pages per day. In addition to its flagship Beijing Youth Daily, the media group publishes nine other newspapers:

 Legal Evening News
 First Financial Daily
 Hebei Youth Daily
 Beijing Science and Technology News
 Youth Weekend
 Beijing Today
 Middle School Times
 Beijing Children's Daily
 Top Horizon
 Beijing Youth Weekly

As well as four magazines:

 CéCi Sisters
 Casual Fashion
 News Mirror
 Campus Report 39.2°

History
On December 22, 2004, Beijing Media Corporation Limited (北青传媒股份有限公司), under Beijing Youth Daily Holdings, listed its H-shares in Hong Kong, becoming the first Chinese mainland media company to be publicly traded overseas.

References

External links
  (current)
  (original)

Chinese-language newspapers (Simplified Chinese)
Newspapers established in 1949
Newspapers published in Beijing
Daily newspapers published in China